The following is a list of notable people associated with The University of Wisconsin–Oshkosh, located in the American city of Oshkosh, Wisconsin.

Notable alumni

Art
Gregory Euclide (1997), American contemporary artist and teacher
Helen Farnsworth Mears, American sculptor
Kim Robertson (1977), Celtic harp player
John Altenburgh, American musician and composer
David Gillingham, American musician and composer, professor of music theory and composition at Central Michigan University
Mark Gruenwald, was an American comic book writer, editor, and occasional penciler known for his long association with Marvel Comics.

Computer science
Brian Paul (1990), creator of the Mesa 3D graphics library, co-founded Tungsten Graphics, which was acquired by VMware in December 2008, where he now works

Business and technology
Daniel Burrus (1971),   is a New York Times bestselling author, futurist, business advisor, and frequent speaker about business strategy and innovation.
Brian Paul (1990), creator of the Mesa 3D graphics library, co-founded Tungsten Graphics, which was acquired by VMware in December 2008, where he now works
Michael Tomczyk (1970), VIC-20 computer pioneer, author, technology expert, Managing Director of the Emerging Technologies Program and Mack Center for Technological Innovation (1995-2013) at the Wharton School;Innovator in Residence at Villanova University (2014-2017); Co-founder, Fintech Ecosystem Development Corp (FEXD: NASDAQ) (2021-Present).
Jim VandeHei (1994), the co-founder and CEO of Axios, former Washington Post political reporter and co-founder of The Politico
Craig Culver (1973), co-founder and board chair of Culver's Restaurants (the home of the 'ButterBurger' - a place that has made cheese curds accessible across the country)

Government and politics
Thomas F. Konop,  US Representative, chairman of the Committee on Expenditures on Public Buildings, Dean of the College of Law at the University of Notre Dame
Scott L. Fitzgerald (1985), US Representative, Wisconsin state senator, Majority Leader of the Wisconsin Senate
Roger Roth (2001), President of the Wisconsin Senate, Wisconsin state assembly member
George de Rue Meiklejohn, United States Assistant Secretary of War, Lieutenant Governor of Nebraska, Nebraska Congressman
Alvin O'Konski (1927), US Representative
Michael K. Reilly, U.S. Representative
John Barnes, Wisconsin Supreme Court justice
Robyn J. Blader, Brigadier General in the Wisconsin Army National Guard
Mark Block (1977), political strategist,  chief of staff and campaign manager for Herman Cain
Carol A. Buettner, Wisconsin state senator
Anne Clarke (politician) (1999) London Assembly Member for Barnet & Camden
Alice Clausing, Wisconsin state senator
William D. Connor, Wisconsin Lt. Governor
Emery Crosby, Wisconsin state assembly member
George R. Currie, Chief Justice of the Wisconsin Supreme Court
George Jonathan Danforth, South Dakota state senator
Brett Davis (1999), Wisconsin state assembly member, Wisconsin State Medicaid Director
John P. Dobyns, Wisconsin state assembly member
Morvin Duel, Wisconsin state senator
James M. Feigley, U.S. Marine Corps general
Daniel Fischer, Wisconsin state assembly member
Jeff Fitzgerald, Wisconsin state assembly member, 78th Speaker of the Wisconsin Assembly
Richard A. Flintrop, Wisconsin state assembly member
W. J. Gilboy, Wisconsin state assembly member
Frank Bateman Keefe, U.S. Representative
Michael G. Kirby, Wisconsin state assembly member
Kenneth Kunde, Wisconsin state assembly member
Terri McCormick, Wisconsin state senator
Balthasar H. Meyer, member of the Interstate Commerce Commission
Robert E. Minahan, Mayor of Green Bay, Wisconsin
Jeremiah O'Neil (1893), Wisconsin state assembly member and judge
Ewald J. Schmeichel, Wisconsin state assembly member
Richard J. Steffens, Wisconsin state assembly member
Amanda Stuck, Wisconsin state assembly member
Jack D. Steinhilber, Wisconsin state senator
William T. Sullivan, Wisconsin state assembly member
Mary Lou E. Van Dreel, Wisconsin state assembly member
Jack Voight, Wisconsin State Treasurer
Esther K. Walling, Wisconsin state assembly member
Merritt F. White, Wisconsin state senator
Serajul Alam Khan, Bangladeshi political theorist

Literature
Dave Truesdale, editor and literary critic, founder of the Tangent Online, an online magazine covers reviews of science fiction and fantasy short fiction as well as providing classic interviews, articles, and editorials. Tangent was the first of its kind in the history of the science fiction field

Media
Fahey Flynn, Chicago news anchorman (active 1953–1983), six time Emmy Award winner 
Jeff Gerritt, winner of the Pulitzer Prize in Editorial Writing (2019), editor of the Palestine Herald-Press in Palestine, Texas 
Jim VandeHei (1994), the co-founder and CEO of Axios, former Washington Post political reporter and co-founder of The Politico

Sports
Marty Below, member of the College Football Hall of Fame
Doe Boyland, Major League Baseball first baseman
Pahl Davis, American football player
Claire Decker, NASCAR driver
Norm DeBriyn (1963), head baseball coach at the University of Arkansas
Jim Gantner (attended until 1974), former Milwaukee Brewers second baseman
Terry Jorgensen, baseball player
Tim Jorgensen, baseball player
Jim Magnuson, baseball player
Dan Neumeier, baseball player
Allison Pottinger, curler
Hal Robl, NFL player
Eric Schafer, professional MMA fighter
Eber Simpson, NFL player
Jack Taschner, baseball relief pitcher
Gary Varsho (attended until 1982), Major League Baseball outfielder
Jarrod Washburn (attended until 1995), Major League Baseball pitcher
Milt Wilson, professional football player

Education
Thomas F. Konop, Dean of the College of Law at the University of Notre Dame, US Representative
Terry White, president of the University of Calgary, vice-chancellor of the Brock University
Michael Tomczyk (1970), VIC-20 computer pioneer, author, technology expert, Director of the Mack Center for Technological Innovation (2001-2013) at the Wharton School, Vietnam veteran

Notable faculty
Notable University of Wisconsin–Oshkosh faculty
Kenneth Grieb, professor of international studies, international studies coordinator and faculty adviser for the multiple award-winning UW Oshkosh Model United Nations Team. Donated $1.9 million to the UW Oshkosh Foundation to establish professorship.
Robert Graham, educator, the 12th Superintendent of Public Instruction of Wisconsin (1882-1887).
Lorenzo D. Harvey, educator, Superintendent of Public Instruction of Wisconsin (1899-1903), president of the Stout Institute at Menomonie, president of the National Education Association
Adelaide Hiebel, illustrator and artist
P. C. Hodgell, fantasy writer, author of the award-winning God Stalker Chronicles, artist and current UW–Oshkosh/University of Minnesota lecturer
Watson Parker, historian and author specializing in the history of the Black Hills,  inducted into the South Dakota Hall of Fame in 2011 for his work, taught at UW–Oshkosh for 21 years.

References in the media
 The fictional anchor of the Onion Radio News, Doyle Redland, is a UW–Oshkosh alumnus according to his "biography."

References

External links
 UW Oshkosh Alumni Relations website

University of Wisconsin-Oshkosh faculty members

University of Wisconsin-Oshkosh people